Hilary L. Rubinstein (born 1946) is an Australian historian and author. She researches and writes on British naval history and modern Jewish history.

Biography 
She graduated with a BA(Hons) in economics, history and politics at Keele University in England, having spent a year on an exchange scholarship at Swarthmore College, Pennsylvania, and subsequently gained a master's degree in librarianship from Simmons College, Massachusetts and a PhD in history for her thesis titled 'King Campbell: The public career of the Marquess of Argyll (1607?-1661)' from the Australian National University.

A Fellow of the Royal Historical Society,  she spent two years (1991–93) as a research fellow in history at the University of Melbourne and from 2013-15 was an adjunct research fellow at the Australian Centre for Jewish Civilisation, Monash University. She is an editor of the Australian Jewish Historical Society Journal. She appeared in Bitter Herbs and Honey, directed by Monique Schwarz, a nostalgic look at Jewish settlement in the inner Melbourne suburb of Carlton. She was Australian correspondent for the American Jewish Committee's American Jewish Year Book from 1992 to 1996 inclusive. In 2018 she took over from Suzanne Rutland as Australian representative on the editorial board of the Jewish Women's Archive's Shalvi/HymanEncyclopedia of Jewish Women project.

She has contributed entries to both the Oxford Dictionary of National Biography (ODNB) and the Australian Dictionary of Biography (ADB). From 2007-2010 she served on the Council of the Navy Records Society, for which she more recently edited the papers of Admiral Sir Philip Durham. Her latest book, a study of the sinking of HMS Royal George in 1782, has been described as "surely the definitive account of the sinking of the Royal George". An aspect of it was featured on the popular History Hit website.

In the 2021 Australia Day Honours, Rubinstein was awarded the Medal of the Order of Australia (OAM) for 'service to community history through a range of roles'.

Selected works

British history

 Captain Luckless: James, first Duke of Hamilton (1606-49) Edinburgh, Scottish Academic Press, 1975.
 'Jewish Emancipation', in A Reader's Guide to British History (ed. David  Loades), vol. 3, London, Fitzroy Dearborn, 2003.
 Trafalgar Captain: Durham of the Defiance, Stroud, Glos., Tempus, 2005.
 Catastrophe at Spithead: The Sinking of the Royal George, Barnsley, Yorks., Seaforth, 2020.
 The Durham Papers: Selections from the Papers of Admiral Sir Philip Charles Henderson Calderwood Durham G.C.B. (1763-1845) London, Navy Records Society, 2019.
 'Philip Charles Durham', in Nelson's Band of Brothers: Lives and Memorials (ed. Peter Hore), Barnsley, Yorks., Seaforth for The 1805 Club, 2015.
 'Durham's Dramas: A Trafalgar Captain at the Polls', in The Trafalgar Chronicle, new series, vol.6, 2021, pp. 89–99, 214-216.

Jewish history

 The Jews in the Modern World: A History since 1750 (co-author), London and New York, Routledge, 2002.
 The Palgrave Dictionary of Anglo-Jewish History (co-author), London, Palgrave Macmillan, 2011.
 Philosemitism: Admiration and Support in the English-Speaking World for Jews, 1840-1939 (co-author), Basingstoke and New York, Macmillan, 1999.
 The Jews in Victoria, 1835-1985, Melbourne, Jewish Museum of Australia, 1985; Sydney, George Allen & Unwin, 1986.
 Chosen: The Jews in Australia, Sydney, George Allen & Unwin, 1987.
 The Jews in Australia: A Thematic History Volume One: 1788-1945, Port Melbourne, Heinemann, 1990.
 A Time to Keep. The Story of Temple Beth Israel: 1930 to 2005 (co-editor ), Melbourne: Hybrid Publishers, 2005.
 'Australian Jewry: a brief historical overview',  in When Jews and Christians Meet: Australian Essays Commemorating Twenty Years of Nostra Aetate (ed. J. W. Roffey) Melbourne, Victorian Council of Christians and Jews, 1985.
 'From Jewish non-distinctiveness to group invisibility: Australian Jewish identity and responses, 1830–1950',  in Jews in the Sixth Continent (ed. William Rubinstein), Sydney, George Allen & Unwin, 1987.
 'Jewish Parliamentarians in Australia, 1849 to the Present', in Jews and Australian Politics (eds. G. B. Levey and P. Mendes), Brighton, Sussex Academic Press, 2004.
 'A pioneering philosemite: Charlotte Elizabeth Tonna (1790-1846) and the Jews' ('Lady Magnus Lecture' to the Jewish Historical Society of England), Jewish Historical Studies, vol.35 (1996-1998), pp. 103–118.
 'Early Manifestations of Holocaust Denial in Australia,' Australian Jewish Historical Society Journal, vol. 14, part 1, 1998, pp. 93–108
 'Sir James Barrett (1862-1945): Australian Philo-Semite,' Australian Jewish Historical Society Journal, vol.12, part 1, 1993, pp. 91–100
 'The Three State Manifestos in Support of the Kimberley Scheme, 1939-40: Texts and Signatories,' Australian Jewish Historical Society Journal, vol.15, part 1, 1999, pp. 35–58
 'Critchley Parker (1911–42): Australian Martyr for Jewish Refugees'  Australian Jewish Historical Society Journal, vol. 11, part 1, 1990, pp. 56–68
 'William Cooper and Kristallnacht: Setting the Record Straight'  Australian Jewish Historical Society Journal, vol. 24, part 1, 2018, pp. 109–142
 'The Greatest Living Female Pianist': Florence Menkmeyer (1860-1946), a Forgotten Australian Virtuoso' Australian Jewish Historical Society Journal, vol. 24, part 3, 2019, pp. 437–467

Australian history

 Menders of the Mind: a history of the Royal Australian & New Zealand College of Psychiatrists 1946-96  (co-author), Oxford University Press, 1996.
 'Empire loyalism in inter-war Victoria', Victorian Historical Journal, vol.70, no.1, June 1999, pp. 67–83.
 'A gross discourtesy to His Majesty': the campaign within Australia, 1930–31, against Sir Isaac Isaacs' appointment as Governor-General', in Australian Jewish Historical Society Journal, vol.14, no.3, Nov 1998, pp. 425–58.
 'Thomas Jerome Kingston Bakhap', in The Biographical Dictionary of the Australian Senate, vol.1,  Carlton South, Vic., Melbourne University Press, 2000.

References

Australian women historians
1946 births
Living people
Historians of Jews and Judaism
Australian naval historians
Jewish Australian academics
Alumni of Keele University
Australian National University alumni
Historians of the United Kingdom
20th-century Australian women writers
20th-century Australian historians
21st-century Australian women writers
21st-century Australian historians
Simmons University alumni
Australian expatriates in the United Kingdom
Australian expatriates in the United States
Australian historians of religion
Fellows of the Royal Historical Society
Academic journal editors
Recipients of the Medal of the Order of Australia